Aiken is the largest city in, and the county seat of, Aiken County, in western South Carolina. It is one of the two largest cities of the Central Savannah River Area. Founded in 1835, Aiken was named after William Aiken, the president of the South Carolina Railroad. It became part of Aiken County when the county was formed in 1871 from parts of Orangeburg, Lexington, Edgefield, and Barnwell counties.

Aiken is home to the University of South Carolina Aiken. According to 2020 census, the population was 32,025. The National Civic League gave Aiken the All-America City Award in 1997. Aiken was also named "best small town of the South" by Southern Living.

Geography and climate

Aiken is near the center of Aiken County. Interstate 20 passes  to the north of the city, with access via South Carolina Highway 19 (Exit 18) and US 1 (Exit 22).

Aiken has a humid subtropical climate characterized by hot, humid summers and cool, dry winters, but experiences milder temperatures throughout the year than the rest of the state. Precipitation is distributed relatively uniformly throughout the year, with mostly rain in the milder months and occasional snow in the winter.

Demographics

2020 census

As of the 2020 United States census, there were 32,025 people, 12,923 households, and 8,479 families residing in the city.

2010 census
The racial makeup of the city was 66.8% White, 28.5% Black or African American, 0.25% Native American, 1.28% Asian, 0.01% Pacific Islander, 0.44% from other races, and 1.09% from two or more races. Hispanic or Latino people of any race were 2.6% of the population.

There were 10,287 households, out of which 28.1% had children under the age of 18 living with them, 48.9% were married couples living together, 13.7% had a female householder with no husband present, and 34.3% were non-families. 29.6% of all households were made up of individuals, and 11.6% had someone living alone who was 65 years of age or older. The average household size was 2.34 and the average family size was 2.90.

In the city, the population was spread out, with 23.2% under the age of 18, 9.4% from 18 to 24, 25.5% from 25 to 44, 24.0% from 45 to 64, and 17.8% who were 65 years of age or older. The median age was 40 years. For every 100 females, there were 87.2 males. For every 100 females age 18 and over, there were 83.0 males.

The median income for a household in the city was $49,100, and the median income for a family was $63,520. Males had a median income of $51,988 versus $28,009 for females. The per capita income for the city was $24,129. About 10.1% of families and 14.4% of the population were below the poverty line, including 21.0% of those under age 18 and 10.5% of those age 65 or over.

Government
Aiken is governed via a mayor-council system. A mayor is elected at large. The city council consists of six members. All six members are elected from single-member districts.

Mayor: Rick Osbon 
District 1: Gail Diggs
District 2: Lessie Price
District 3: Kay Brohl
District 4: Ed Girardeau
District 5: Andrea Neira Gregory
District 6: Ed Woltz

History
The municipality of Aiken was incorporated on December 19, 1835. The community formed around the terminus of the South Carolina Canal and Railroad Company, a rail line from Charleston to the Savannah River, and was named for William Aiken, the railroad's first president.

During Sherman's March to the Sea in the American Civil War Sherman ordered Hugh Judson Kilpatrick and the cavalry corps he commanded to march through South Carolina. By February 5, they had reached Aiken County. While in Aiken county Kilpatrick fought Joseph Wheeler and his cavalry corps. This battle, called the Battle of Aiken, was a Confederate victory.

Originally it was in the Edgefield District. With population increases, in 1871 Aiken County was organized, made up of parts of neighboring counties. Among its founding commissioners were three African-American legislators: Prince Rivers; Samuel J. Lee, speaker of the state House and the first black man admitted to the South Carolina Bar; and Charles D. Hayne, a free man of color from one of Charleston's elite families.

Aiken was a planned town, and many of the streets in the historic district are named for other cities and counties in South Carolina, including Abbeville, Barnwell, Beaufort, Chesterfield, Colleton, Columbia, Dillon, Edgefield, Edisto, Fairfield, Florence, Greenville, Hampton, Horry, Jasper, Kershaw, Lancaster, Laurens, Marion, Marlboro, McCormick, Newberry, Orangeburg, Pendleton, Pickens, Richland, Sumter, Union, Williamsburg and York.

In the late 19th century, Aiken gained fame as a wintering spot for wealthy people from the Northeast. Thomas Hitchcock, Sr. and William C. Whitney established the Aiken Winter Colony. Over the years Aiken became a winter home for many notable people, including George H. Bostwick, James B. Eustis, Madeleine Astor, William Kissam Vanderbilt, Eugene Grace, president of Bethlehem Steel, Allan Pinkerton, and W. Averell Harriman.

Between 1890 and the 1920s, many Jewish immigrants settled in Aiken. The Jewish immigrants were from Eastern Europe, including Russia and Poland. Many were from Knyszyn, Poland. In 1905, a group of Russian-Jewish socialists from New York founded a farming colony in Aiken County that was known as "Happyville". Adath (Adas) Yeshurun (Congregation of Israel) Synagogue was chartered in Aiken in 1921 and the cornerstone was laid in 1925. An historical marker was added to the synagogue in 2014, sponsored by the Jewish Historical Society of South Carolina. In 1903, the Jewish-American peddler Abraham Surasky was the victim of an antisemitic murder that occurred near Aiken.

Savannah River Plant
The United States Atomic Energy Commission's selection of a site near Aiken for a plant to produce fuel for thermonuclear weapons was announced on November 30, 1950. Residences and businesses at Ellenton, South Carolina, were bought for use for the plant site. Residents were moved to New Ellenton, which was constructed about eight miles north, or to neighboring towns.

The site was named the Savannah River Plant, and renamed the Savannah River Site in 1989. The facility contains five production reactors, fuel fabrication facilities, a research laboratory, heavy water production facilities, two fuel reprocessing facilities, and tritium recovery facilities.

Historic places
 Aiken Golf Club
 Aiken Polo Club
 Aiken Preparatory School
 Aiken Tennis Club
 Hopelands Gardens
 Old Aiken Post Office
 Palmetto Golf Club
Hitchcock Woods
 St. Mary Help of Christians Catholic Church
 Whitehall mansion
 The Aiken Colored Cemetery, Aiken Mile Track, Aiken Training Track, Aiken Winter Colony Historic District I, Aiken Winter Colony Historic District II, Aiken Winter Colony Historic District III, Chancellor James P. Carroll House, Chinaberry, Coker Spring, Court Tennis Building, Crossways, Dawson-Vanderhorst House, Immanuel School, Joye Cottage, Legare-Morgan House, Phelps House, Pickens House, St. Mary Help of Christians Church, St. Thaddeus Episcopal Church, Charles E. Simons, Jr. Federal Court House, Whitehall, and Willcox's are listed on the National Register of Historic Places.

Education

Schools

Public schools:
 Aiken Elementary School
 Aiken High School
 Aiken Middle School
Aiken Scholars Academy 
 Chukker Creek Elementary
 East Aiken School of the Arts
 JD Lever Elementary School
 Jackson STEM Middle School
 Kennedy Middle School
 Lloyd Kennedy Charter School
 Millbrook Elementary School
 North Aiken Elementary School
 Redcliffe Elementary School
 Schofield Middle School
 Silver Bluff High School
 South Aiken High School
Private schools:
 Aiken Christian School
 Mead Hall Episcopal School
 Palmetto Academy Day School
 St. Mary Help of Christians Catholic School
 Second Baptist Christian Preparatory School
 South Aiken Baptist Christian School
 Town Creek Christian Academy 
Charter schools:
 Lloyd Kennedy Charter School
 Tall Pines Stem Academy
 Horse Creek Academy

Colleges and universities
 Aiken Technical College
 University of South Carolina at Aiken

Library
Aiken has a public library, a branch of the ABBE Regional Library System.

Steeplechase racing
The Aiken Steeplechase Association, founded in 1930, hosts the Imperial Cup each March and the Holiday Cup in October, both races sanctioned by the National Steeplechase Association. This event draws more than 30,000 spectators.

The Aiken Thoroughbred Racing Hall of Fame and Museum was established in 1977 as a tribute to the famous flat racing and steeplechase thoroughbred horses trained at the Aiken Training Track.

Other events
Aiken hosts many polo matches at its numerous polo fields. Other local events include:

 Aiken Triple Crown
 Aiken's Makin'
 Battle of Aiken Reenactment
 Bluegrass Festival
 Fall Steeplechase
 Hops & Hogs
 The Lobster Races
 Western Carolina State Fair
 The Whiskey Road Race
 Aiken City Limits (ACL)

Attractions
 Aiken Center for Arts - Hosts educational classes, a fine arts gallery, and exhibition opportunities.
 Aiken County Farmers Market - The oldest food market in South Carolina.
 Aiken County Historical Museum - A living museum, also known as "Banksia" after the banksia rose, displays special exhibits of items from residents.
 Aiken State Park
 Aiken Thoroughbred Racing Hall of Fame and Museum - Displays the area's rich thoroughbred history with memorabilia, photography, and trophies.
 Aiken Visitors Center and Train Museum - The railroad depot has nine dioramas depicting railroad history on the second floor.
 Center for African American History, Art, and Culture - Hosts special events on African American history.
 DuPont Planetarium and RPSEC Observatory - Provides live presentations of stars, constellations, and visible planets.
Hitchcock Woods - One of the largest urban forests in the United States, at 2100 acres. Provides hiking, walking, and equestrian trails.
 Juilliard in Aiken - Live artistic performances, classes, lectures, and workshops.
 Redcliffe Plantation State Historic - slaves' and owners' lives depicted.
 Rose Hill Estate - Historic housing for overnight stays, weddings, reunions, meetings, and dinner parties.

Notable people
In the late 19th century and the first part of the 20th century, Aiken served as a winter playground for many of the country's wealthiest families, such as the Vanderbilts, Bostwicks, and the Whitneys.

 Lee Atwater (1951–1991), Republican strategist, advisor to Ronald Reagan and George H. W. Bush; raised in Aiken
Charles E. Bohlen (1904-1974), U.S. diplomat; raised in Aiken
 George H. Bostwick (1909–1982), court tennis player, steeplechase jockey and horse trainer, eight-goal polo player; "Pete" was grandson of Jabez A. Bostwick, wealthy Standard Oil partner
 Anna Camp, actress, played Sarah Newlin in the HBO series True Blood and Aubrey in the film Pitch Perfect
 Jimmy Carter, boxer, member of the International Boxing Hall of Fame
 Barney Chavous, NFL player for the Denver Broncos
 Corey Chavous, NFL player
 F. Ambrose Clark, equestrian, heir to the Singer Sewing Machine Company fortune
 Robert C. De Large (1842–1874), born in Aiken, U.S. Representative from South Carolina
 Pam Durban, American novelist and short-story writer
 Matilda Evans, the first African-American woman licensed to practice medicine in South Carolina
 Helen Lee Franklin, teacher and social justice advocate
 Thomas Hitchcock and wife Louise owned a  estate near Aiken where in 1892 he founded the Palmetto Golf Club; in 1916, Louise founded Aiken Preparatory School. They built a steeplechase training center and in 1939 founded Hitchcock Woods with 1,191 acres of their estate.
 Tommy Hitchcock, Jr. (1900–1944), son of Thomas and Louise Hitchcock, born in Aiken; polo player; veteran of the Lafayette Escadrille in World War I, killed in World War II
 Priscilla A. Wooten (1936-2017), American politician who served in the New York City Council from 1983 to 2001
 Hope Goddard Iselin, wife of Charles Oliver Iselin and original owner of Hopeland Gardens in Aiken
 Kevin Kisner, PGA Tour Golfer
 DeMarcus Lawrence, American football linebacker for the Dallas Cowboys
 Fred L. Lowery, Southern Baptist clergyman, began pastorate at Bethel Baptist Church in Aiken in 1960
 Devereux Milburn, grandson of Charles Steele, a senior partner at J.P. Morgan & Company, a 10-goal polo player, and one of what was known as the Big Four in international polo
 Janie L. Mines, First African-American woman to graduate from the U.S. Naval Academy (1980)
 Eugene Odum, author of Fundamentals of Ecology, founded Savannah River Ecology Laboratory south of Aiken to study the ecological impacts of the nuclear facility
 Michael Dean Perry, former NFL defensive lineman, six-time Pro Bowl selection (1989–91, 93–94, 96), NCAA first-team All-American (1987)
 William Refrigerator Perry, former NFL defensive lineman with Super Bowl XX champion Chicago Bears and 3-time NCAA All-American (1982–1984)
 Frederick H. Prince, financier who purchased William Kissam Vanderbilt's cottage Marble House in Newport, Rhode Island
 Pat Sawilowsky (b. 1930), past president of the National Ladies Auxiliary of Jewish War Veterans; her father, Herbert B. Ram, owned and named Patricia Theater in downtown Aiken after her, and the companion Rosemary Theater was named for her sister.
 Charlie Simpkins, silver medalist, triple jump, 1992 Summer Olympics
 Marion Hartzog Smoak (1916-2020), lawyer, United States diplomat, and South Carolina state senator 
 Grace Taylor, gymnast
 Dekoda Watson, athlete, linebacker with San Francisco 49ers and Tampa Bay Buccaneers
 William C. Whitney, helped establish "Winter Colony," a 69-room winter residence
 Paul Wight (Big Show) (b. 1972), professional wrestler and actor, seven-time world champion in wrestling
 Troy Williamson (b. 1983), professional football player
 Gamel Woolsey (1895–1968), writer, coined the phrase "pornography of violence" in her Spanish Civil War memoir Death's Other Kingdom (also published as Malaga Burning), born in Aiken
 Marly Youmans, novelist and poet, born in Aiken
 Leon Lott, commander of the South Carolina State Guard and Sheriff of Richland County, South Carolina

See also 
 List of municipalities in South Carolina

Notes

References

External links

 
 Greater Aiken Chamber of Commerce

 
Cities in South Carolina
Cities in Aiken County, South Carolina
County seats in South Carolina
Augusta metropolitan area
1835 establishments in South Carolina
Populated places established in 1835